The 2015–16 Savannah State Lady Tigers Basketball Team represents Savannah State University. The Tigers are currently coached by their 12th year coach, Mr. Cedric Baker. They play their home games in Tiger Arena.

Roster

Schedule 

|-
!colspan=9 style="background:#00209F; color:white;"| Exhibition

|-
!colspan=9 style="background:#FF6600; color:white;"| Non-Conference Regular Season

|-
!colspan=9 style="background:#00209F; color:white;"| Mid-Eastern Conference Season
|-

|-

References

Savannah State Lady Tigers basketball seasons
Savannah State Lady Tigers basketball
Savannah State Lady Tigers basketball